The 1975 Swedish Open was a combined men's and women's tennis tournament played on outdoor clay courts held in Båstad, Sweden. It was classified as a Group B category tournament and was part of the 1975 Grand Prix circuit. It was the 28th edition of the tournament and was held from 7 July until 7 July 1975. Manuel Orantes and Sue Barker won the singles titles.

Finals

Men's singles
 Manuel Orantes defeated  José Higueras 6–0, 6–3

Women's singles
 Sue Barker defeated  Helga Masthoff 6–4, 6–0

Men's doubles
 Ove Nils Bengtson /  Björn Borg defeated  Juan Gisbert /  Manuel Orantes 7–6, 7–5

Women's doubles
 Janet Newberry /  Pam Teeguarden defeated  Fiorella Bonicelli /  Raquel Giscafré 6–3, 6–3

References

External links
 ITF – tournament edition details

Swedish Open
Swedish Open
Swedish Open
Swedish Open